Pectolinarigenin is a Cirsium isolate with anti-inflammatory activity and belongs to the flavones.

References

Flavones